Raghunathpur subdivision is a subdivision of the Purulia district in the state of West Bengal, India.

History
Purulia district was divided into four subdivisions, viz., Purulia Sadar, Manbazar, Jhalda and Raghunathpur, with effect from 6 April 2017, as per Order No. 100-AR/P/2R-2/1999 dated 30 March 2017 issued by the Government of West Bengal, in the Kolkata Gazette dated 30 March 2017.

Subdivisions
Purulia district is divided into the following administrative subdivisions:

Note: The 2011 census data has been recast as per reorganisation of the subdivisions. There may be minor variations.

Administrative units

Raghunathpur subdivision has  7 police stations, 6 community development blocks, 6 panchayat samitis, 49 gram panchayats, 687 inhabited villages, 1 municipality, 14 census towns. The single municipality is at Raghunathpur. The census towns are: Adra, Kantaranguri, Lapara, Saltor, Hijuli, Par Beliya, Santaldih Power Project Town, Kanki, Dubra, Chapari, Shankara, Arra, Nabagram and Murulia. The subdivision has its headquarters at Raghunathpur.

Police stations
Police stations in Raghunathpur subdivision have the following features and jurisdiction:

Blocks
Community development blocks in Raghunathpur subdivision are:

Gram Panchayats
The subdivision contains 49 gram panchayats under 6 community development blocs:

 Para block: Anara, Deoli, Jabarrah–Jhapra–II, Udaypur–Joynagar, Bahara, Dubra, Nadiha Surulia, Bhowridih, Jabarrah–Jhapra–I and Para.
 Raghunathpur–I block: Arrah, Bero, Khajura, Sanka, Babugram, Chorpahari and Nutandi.
 Raghunathpur–II block: Barrah, Joradih, Nildih, Cheliama, Mangalda–Mautore and Nutandih.
 Neturia block: Bhamuria, Guniara, Raibandh, Sarbari, Digha, Janardandih and Saltore.
 Santuri block: Balitora, Ramchandrapur– Kotaldi, Tarabari,  Garsika, Muradi and Santuri.
 Kashipur block: Agardi–Chitra, Gorandih, Manihara, Sonathali, Barrah, Hadalda–Uparrah, Rangamati–Ranjandih, Beko, Kalidaha, Simla–Dhanara, Gagnabad, Kashipur and Sonaijuri.

Education
Given in the table below (data in numbers) is a comprehensive picture of the education scenario in Purulia district, after reorganisation of the district in 2017, with data for the year 2013-14. (There may be minor variations because of data recasting).:

Note: Primary schools include junior basic schools; middle schools, high schools and higher secondary schools include madrasahs; technical schools include junior technical schools, junior government polytechnics, industrial technical institutes, industrial training centres, nursing training institutes etc.; technical and professional colleges include engineering colleges, medical colleges, para-medical institutes, management colleges, teachers training and nursing training colleges, law colleges, art colleges, music colleges etc. Special and non-formal education centres include sishu siksha kendras, madhyamik siksha kendras, centres of Rabindra mukta vidyalaya, recognised Sanskrit tols, institutions for the blind and other handicapped persons, Anganwadi centres, reformatory schools etc.

Educational institutions
The following institutions are located in Raghunathpur subdivision:
Raghunathpur College was established in 1961 at Raghunathpur
Kashipur Michael Madhusudhan Mahavidyalaya was established in 2000 at Kashipur.
Panchakot Mahavidyalaya was established in 2001 at Sarbari.
Santaldih College was established in 2008 at Usir, PO Chatarmahul.

Healthcare
The table below (all data in numbers) presents an overview of the medical facilities available and patients treated in the hospitals, health centres and sub-centres in 2014 in Purulia district, after reorganisation of the district in 2017, with data for the year 2013-14. (There may be minor variations because of data recasting).:

.* Excluding nursing homes.

Medical facilities
Medical facilities in Raghunathpur subdivision are as follows:

Hospitals: (Name, location, beds) 
Raghunathpur Subdivional Hospital, Raghunathpur M, 100 beds
Santaldih Thermal Hospital, Santaldih, 10 beds
South Eastern Railway Hospital, Adra, 222 beds

Rural Hospitals: (Name, CD block, location, beds) 

Harmadih Rural Hospital, Neturia CD block, Harmadih, 30 beds
Banda (Chelyama) Rural Hospital, Raghunathpur II CD block, Cheliyama, 30 beds
Kolloli Rural Hospital, Kashipur CD block, Panchakot Raj, 30 beds
Muraddi Rural Hospital, Santuri CD block, Muraddi, 30 beds
Para Rural Hospital, Para CD block, Para, 30 beds

Block Primary Health Centres: (Name, CD block, location, beds)
Balitora Block Primary Health Centre, Santuri CD block, Balitora, 10 beds

Primary Health Centres : (CD block-wise)(CD block, PHC location, beds)
Raghunathpur I CD block:Babudergram (PO Sanko) (6), Biltora (PO Gadibera) (4)
Raghunathpur II CD block: Bogra (10), Nildih (4)
Neturia CD block: Bartoria (2), Gunara (10)
Kashipur CD block: Talajuri (PO Gourangdih) (10), Kroshjuri (10), Agardih (2), Kantarangini (PO Beko) (6)
Santuri CD block: Santuri (10)
Para CD block: Nadiha (10), Ashar Bandh (PO Tentulbari) (2), Phursrabad (4)

Electoral constituencies
Lok Sabha (parliamentary) and Vidhan Sabha (state assembly) constituencies in Purulia district were as follows:

References

Subdivisions of West Bengal
Subdivisions in Purulia district
Purulia district